The 1982 Kentucky Derby was the 108th running of the Kentucky Derby. The race took place on May 1, 1982, with 141,009 people in attendance.

Full results

References

1982
Kentucky Derby
Derby
Kentucky
Kentucky Derby